The 1991–92 London Crusaders season was the twelfth in the club's history. It was their first season under the name of the London Crusaders, after a decade under the Fulham RLFC name. They competed in the 1991–92 Second Division of the Rugby Football League. They also competed in the 1992 Challenge Cup, 1991–92 Lancashire Cup and the 1991–92 League Cup. They finished the season in 4th place in the second tier of British professional rugby league.

Second Division Final Standings

References

External links
Rugby League Project

London Broncos seasons
London Broncos season
1991 in rugby league by club
1991 in English rugby league
London Broncos season
1992 in rugby league by club
1992 in English rugby league